Kroni is a figure in Ayyavazhi mythology. He is the primordial manifestation of evil, and manifests in various forms of evil, such as Ravana and Duryodhana, in different ages or yugas. To counteract and destroy the evil of Kroni's manifestations, Mayon (a Tamil name for Vishnu) incarnates as Avatars such as Rama and Krishna. He seems to be more evil than the demon Kali of the Mahabharata and Kalki Purana sharing similarities with Lucifer.

Kroni in the Akilathirattu Ammanai
According to the Akilathirattu Ammanai, the Ayyavazhi holy book, Kroni was born in the first of the Eight Yukams (Yuga (Sanskrit); Aeons ((English)) with multitudinous limbs each the size of a mountain, and was the first evil to be born in the Universe. He had a fire of ravenous hunger in his stomach, and he drank all the waters of the sea to quell it.  When the water was insufficient, he then swallowed Kailayam (Kailash), the abode of Shiva, and then proceeded to devour the entire Universe.  Mayon, residing with Shiva in Kailayam, escaped promptly and undertook a Tavam (Tapas in Sanskrit, Penance in English) to get help from Shiva to destroy Kroni. Shiva granted the help, but made Mayon aware of the necessity of appearing in different forms for the successive six yukams in order to destroy the six fragments of Kroni.  Being aware of the mission, Mayon sliced Kroni into six fragments and saved the Universe, and with that event the first Yukam ended.

Fragments of Kroni
The six fragments of Kroni were then born as evil spirits (or Asuras) in six successive Yukams (aeons). In all the yukams Mayon had to incarnate in the world to destroy the evils. The six fragments were known as

Kuntomasali
Thillaimallalan and Mallosivakanan
Suraparppan Sinkamukasuran and Iraniyan
Ravanan
Thuriyothanan and the Ninety-nine Brothers
Kaliyan

Kroni, the spirit of Kali Yuga, is said to be omnipresent in the present age, and this is one of the reasons why followers of Ayya Vazhi, like other Hindus, believe that the current yuga, Kali Yuga, is so degraded.

Philosophical view 

Philosophically, Kroni is viewed as the evil which prevents the soul from attaining absolute bliss or knowledge. The six fragments are considered to be six evils found in the six chakras except Sahasrara of the physical human body. It is stated that every human being should overcome the qualities of the six fragments (ill effects) in order to attain divinity (Sahasrara), the state of union with God.

But this view is often criticised by some followers because the Akilam did not mention Kroni in direct relation to Chakras. As some believe that many philosophical concepts are symbolised indirectly as mythical figures in a story form in Akilam, this view on Kroni is accepted during religious studies.

* Chakras :- The yugas assumed as chakras above, is one of the philosophical views and is not mentioned directly in Akilathirattu.

See also
List of Ayyavazhi-related articles
Ayyavazhi mythology
Kaliyan
Kali (demon)

References

 G. Patrick, Religion and Subaltern Agency, University of Madras, 2003
 Ari Sundara Mani, Akilathirattu Ammanai Parayana Urai, Vaikundar Thirukkudumbam Publications, 2002.

Ayyavazhi mythology
Demons
Ayyavazhi philosophical concepts
Destroyer gods
Evil gods